Thomas Frye was a painter.

Thomas Fry(e) may also refer to:

Thomas Frye (Rhode Island politician) (1666–1748), deputy governor of the Colony of Rhode Island and Providence Plantations

See also
Thomas Fry (disambiguation)